A Parliamentary State Secretary is a member of the Bundestag given a portfolio to assist a Minister with running a government ministry. The position is roughly analogous to deputy ministers.

In 2021, there are 36 parliamentary state secretaries in the Merkel IV Cabinet. The position was first introduced in 1967 to help younger politicians gain experience for future ministerial roles.

See also 
 Parliamentary secretary, a similar position in several Westminster-style systems of government
 Parliamentary Under-Secretary of State or Parliamentary Private Secretary, similar positions in the United Kingdom

References

Bundestag
Government occupations